Mooru Guttu Ondu Sullu Ondu Nija  is a 2009 Kannada movie directed by Dinesh Babu. The film stars Ramesh Aravind in the lead role. Komal, Asha Latha and Sharan appear in supporting roles.

Plot
This is a low budget comedy movie with the overall movie being shot in a single house. The movie starts with the family having four children with Komal as the eldest son and three girls. The overall movie is a drama taking place in a house in one day. The parents are scheduled to a one-day trip to Tirupati. The children, knowing about it, the elder three children inform their lovers to come to their home.

But the comedy starts when their aunt comes to sleep in their home. The lovers are supposed to hide in their rooms so that they don't get seen by other siblings and the aunt. After some time the appu (Ramesh Aravind) arrives with some relational links and sleeps in their home. He visits each of the children's rooms and the interesting thing is to watch how each of them hide their lovers in their home. Finally, next day when the parents arrive, various truths are brought in front of them with some feelings.

Cast

Ramesh Aravind as Appu
Komal as Siddaramu  a.k.a. Siddu
Nancy as Sonu
Sharan 
 Mandya Ramesh
 Asha Latha as a deaf aunty
Srinivasa Murthy as an affluent person
 Sudha Belawadi

Reception

Critical responses 

R G Vijayasarathy of Rediff.com scored the film at 3 out of 5 stars and says "Ramesh and Asha Latha shout in most of the sequences and this could have been avoided. And slapping on the cheek is another irritating factor in the film and it is certainly not comedy. Still, Mooru Guttu Ondhu Sullu Ondhu Nija is an enjoyable healthy comedy and a film like this has to be encouraged". A critic from The New Indian Express wrote "The film has no gory stunt scenes. It has only one song Yeddelo Madesha. Music director Suma Shastri has provided good background music. It is a worthy watch for families". BSS from  Deccan Herald wrote "story takes a sentimental turn, but kudos to all the principal characters for not losing their poise. Though Ramesh’s dialogues smack of urbane intelligence, the actor doesn’t make it obvious. Komal is simply howlarious while Ashalatha comes second. ‘3Guttu, ondu sullu...’ is one of those films that can be viewed comfortably".

References

2009 films
2000s Kannada-language films
Indian comedy films
Films directed by Dinesh Baboo